Robert Werdann (born September 12, 1970) is an American former professional basketball player and coach.

Career
Born in Sunnyside, Queens, New York, he attended Archbishop Molloy High School in Queens, New York, graduating in 1988. In his senior year of high school, he won McDonald's High School All-American. During his college playing career at St. John's University, he became the all-time leader in career blocked shots. He was also a part of the team that won the NIT Championship in 1989, the Big East Championship in 1992, and reached the NCAA tournament three times. In his junior year, he won All-Big East Honors. While playing for St. John's, Werdann was third-team All-Big East as a junior.

He was selected by the Denver Nuggets in the second round (46th overall) of the 1992 NBA draft. A 6'11" center from St. John's University, Werdann played in three NBA seasons. He played for the Nuggets and New Jersey Nets. He also played with the Harrisburg Hammerheads of the CBA. In his NBA career, Werdann played in 47 games and scored a total of 101 points.

He later became an assistant coach with the New Orleans Hornets after earlier working for the team as a player scout for five years.

The Golden State Warriors named Robert Werdann an assistant coach for the 2010–11 season for head coach Keith Smart, along with Jerry Sichting, Calbert Cheaney, and Mark Price. In 2011, he became an assistant coach with the Charlotte Bobcats. In 2013, he was coaching in Puerto Rico. In October 2013, he was hired by the Idaho Stampede as an assistant coach for the 2013–14 season. In 2014, Robert became the professional scout for the Detroit Pistons. In 2017, he was named the head coach of the Pistons' NBA G League affiliate, the Grand Rapids Drive.

Notes

External links
G League coaches

1970 births
Living people
American men's basketball coaches
American men's basketball players
Archbishop Molloy High School alumni
Baltimore Bayrunners players
Basketball coaches from New York (state)
Basketball players from New York City
Centers (basketball)
Charlotte Bobcats assistant coaches
Denver Nuggets draft picks
Denver Nuggets players
Golden State Warriors assistant coaches
Grand Rapids Drive coaches
Idaho Stampede coaches
McDonald's High School All-Americans
New Jersey Nets players
New Orleans Hornets assistant coaches
Parade High School All-Americans (boys' basketball)
People from Sunnyside, Queens
Sportspeople from Queens, New York
St. John's Red Storm men's basketball players
Yakima Sun Kings players